was a Japanese shrine maiden who is believed to have invented the theatrical art form of kabuki. Okuni's troupe quickly gained immense popularity, and were known for their performers, who were often lower-class women Okuni had recruited to act in her all-female theatre group.

Okuni continued to perform kabuki with her troupe until her retirement and disappearance sometime around 1610. She is believed to have died sometime around 1613.

History

Early years

Born , Okuni grew up in the vicinity of the Izumo shrine, where her father, Nakamura Sanemon, worked as a blacksmith, and where several other family members served. As it was a custom of the time to send priests,  and others to solicit contributions for the shrine, she was sent to Kyoto to perform sacred dances and songs.

Though this dance traces its origins to Kūya, a 10th-century evangelist of Pure Land Buddhism, by Okuni's time it had become a largely secular folk dance, and her particular adaptation tended to be known for its sultriness and sexual innuendo. Other popular themes for Okuni's acts included humorous skits about lover's trysts at various public establishments and meetings between men and prostitutes. Between these and other dances and acts, she garnered much attention and began to draw large crowds wherever she performed. Eventually she was summoned to return to the shrine, a call she ignored, though she continued to send money back.

Founding of kabuki

Around 1603, Okuni began performing on the dry riverbed of the Shijōgawara (Fourth Street Dry Riverbed) of the Kamo River and at Kitano Shrine. Okuni also performed for the ladies of the Imperial court. Gathering up the female outcasts and misfits of the region, particularly those involved in prostitution, Okuni gave them direction, teaching them acting, dancing and singing skills in order to form her troupe. 

In either case, others labelled Okuni's troupe performances "kabuki" due to their eccentricity and social daring. The earliest performances of kabuki were dancing and song with no significant plot, often disdained as overly sexual and cacophonous, but equally lauded as colourful and beautiful.

Okuni's troupe was exclusively female. Thus, she required her actresses to play both male and female roles. As her troupe gained fame, she was emulated by many others, particularly brothels, which offered such shows to amuse wealthy clients, as well as to gain prostitutes who had marketable acting and singing skills.

Later years
One of Okuni's most popular performances featured the romantic character of Nagoya Sansaburō, a real-life samurai who had died in 1603. Onstage, Okuni's beautiful voice lured Sansaburō's spirit back into the world of the living to dance with her. Despite historical speculation about the possible links between Okuni and Sansaburō, it remains uncertain whether the pair had ever been lovers during his lifetime, or whether she had simply incorporated him into her storytelling.

Okuni retired around 1610, and after that time she disappeared. In 1629, due to outcry for moral reform and concern about fights breaking out between men trying to win the attention of the actresses,  Tokugawa Iemitsu forbade women from performing in kabuki. They were quickly replaced by young men as actors and "actresses", though this was soon banned as well due to some of the same issues of prostitution and corruption of morals, restricting the performances to those by older men, which is a standing practice in the official theatres even today.

There are several conflicting theories of Okuni's year of death; some say she died in 1610, others in 1613, or in 1640.

Cultural impact and legacy

In addition to her founding of kabuki, Okuni contributed to Japanese theatre as a whole. This has been incorporated in several Japanese theatre arts beyond that of kabuki. In addition, she has also influenced modern musical theatre.

Ariyoshi Sawako published her novel  in the late 1960s, crafting a fictional biography of the dancer.

A commemorative statue of Izumo no Okuni is located in Kyoto by the Kamo River, not far from the Minami-za kabuki theatre.

References

Bibliography

External links

Izumo no Okuni, at Distinguished Women
Izumo no Okuni, Japanese Art and Architecture Net Users System
Izumo no Okuni, at Drama Archives

1570s births
1610s deaths
Year of death uncertain
16th-century clergy
17th-century clergy
16th-century Japanese women writers
17th-century Japanese actresses
16th-century Japanese dramatists and playwrights
17th-century Japanese dramatists and playwrights
17th-century Japanese women writers
People from Shimane Prefecture
Japanese entertainers
History of theatre
Kabuki playwrights
Miko
Kabuki
People of Sengoku-period Japan
Women dramatists and playwrights